Ideato North is a Local Government Area in Imo State, Nigeria. It was created in 1976 as Ideato Local Government, but was later divided into both Ideato North, and Ideato South Villages belonging to the community of Arondizuogu are located in this area.

Its administrative headquarters is in Urualla. Other towns in this LGA include: Obodoukwu, Akokwa, Uzii, Osina, Akpulu, Umualaoma and Isiokpo.

As at 2011 it had a population of 183,260.

References  

 Ideato North Imo State

Local Government Areas in Imo State
Local Government Areas in Igboland
Towns in Imo State